Ibrahim Khalfan Al Khalfan (born 25 November 1961) is a retired Qatari international footballer who played as a winger. He competed in the men's tournament at the 1984 Summer Olympics.

He is the father of Khalfan Ibrahim Al Khalfan, a former footballer who played for Al Sadd and the Qatar national team.

International goals

References

External links
ابراهيم خلفان: مجموعة 81 ستعمل لخدمة المجتمع - alarab.qa

1961 births
Living people
People from Doha
Qatari footballers
Qatar international footballers
Association football forwards
Al-Arabi SC (Qatar) players
1980 AFC Asian Cup players
1984 AFC Asian Cup players
1988 AFC Asian Cup players
Qatar Stars League players
Olympic footballers of Qatar
Footballers at the 1984 Summer Olympics